The Communauté de communes du Canton d'Hucqueliers et environs was located in the Pas-de-Calais département, in northern France. It was created in January 1997. It was merged into the new Communauté de communes du Haut Pays du Montreuillois in January 2017.

Composition
It comprised the following 24 communes:

Aix-en-Ergny 
Alette  
Avesnes 
Bécourt  
Beussent  
Bezinghem 
Bimont 
Bourthes  
Campagne-lès-Boulonnais  
Clenleu 
Enquin-sur-Baillons  
Ergny 
Herly 
Hucqueliers 
Humbert  
Maninghem 
Parenty  
Preures  
Quilen  
Rumilly 
Saint-Michel-sous-Bois  
Verchocq  
Wicquinghem  
Zoteux

References 

Hucqueliers